Tiana Atkinson (born 30 April 2002) is an Australian cricketer who plays as a right-handed batter for Victoria in the Women's National Cricket League (WNCL).

Domestic career
Atkinson plays grade cricket for Dandenong Cricket Club. She made her debut for Victoria on 10 March 2022, against Queensland in the WNCL, scoring 6 runs as her side won by 64 runs. She played four matches for the side in the 2022–23 WNCL, scoring 57 runs with a top score of 38.

References

External links

2002 births
Living people
Place of birth missing (living people)
Australian women cricketers
Victoria women cricketers